Pruchya Isaro (born 16 October 1995) is a tennis player from Thailand playing on the ATP Challenger Tour. On 28 May 2018, he reached his highest ATP singles ranking of 664 and his highest doubles ranking of 312 achieved on 2 February 2015.

He competed for the Thailand Davis Cup team between 2013 and 2016 with a win–loss record of 12–6.

Tour titles

Doubles

External links
 

1995 births
Living people
Pruchya Isaro
Pruchya Isaro
Tennis players at the 2014 Asian Games
Pruchya Isaro
Competitors at the 2021 Southeast Asian Games
Pruchya Isaro
Pruchya Isaro
Southeast Asian Games medalists in tennis
Pruchya Isaro